The 1931–32 New York Rangers season was the franchise's sixth season. In the regular season, the Rangers won the American Division with a 23–17–8 record. New York qualified for the Stanley Cup playoffs, where the Rangers defeated the Montreal Canadiens 3–1 to reach the Stanley Cup Finals for the third time in franchise history. In the Cup Finals, New York lost to the Toronto Maple Leafs, three games to none.

Regular season

Final standings

Record vs. opponents

Schedule and results

|- align="center" bgcolor="#CCFFCC"
| 1 || 12 || @ Montreal Canadiens || 4–1 || 1–0–0
|- align="center" bgcolor="#FFBBBB"
| 2 || 15 || Detroit Falcons || 2–1 || 1–1–0
|- align="center" bgcolor="#CCFFCC"
| 3 || 17 || New York Americans || 3–0 || 2–1–0
|- align="center" bgcolor="#CCFFCC"
| 4 || 19 || Boston Bruins || 2–1 || 3–1–0
|- align="center" bgcolor="#CCFFCC"
| 5 || 21 || @ Toronto Maple Leafs || 5–3 || 4–1–0
|- align="center" bgcolor="white"
| 6 || 24 || Chicago Black Hawks || 1 – 1 OT || 4–1–1
|- align="center" bgcolor="#CCFFCC"
| 7 || 29 || @ Chicago Black Hawks || 5–0 || 5–1–1
|-

|- align="center" bgcolor="white"
| 8 || 3 || @ Detroit Falcons || 1 – 1 OT || 5–1–2
|- align="center" bgcolor="#FFBBBB"
| 9 || 8 || Toronto Maple Leafs || 4–2 || 5–2–2
|- align="center" bgcolor="#CCFFCC"
| 10 || 10 || @ Montreal Maroons || 3–2 || 6–2–2
|- align="center" bgcolor="#CCFFCC"
| 11 || 13 || @ New York Americans || 2–1 || 7–2–2
|- align="center" bgcolor="white"
| 12 || 15 || @ Boston Bruins || 2 – 2 OT || 7–2–3
|- align="center" bgcolor="#CCFFCC"
| 13 || 17 || Montreal Maroons || 5 – 4 OT || 8–2–3
|- align="center" bgcolor="white"
| 14 || 19 || @ Montreal Canadiens || 2 – 2 OT || 8–2–4
|- align="center" bgcolor="#CCFFCC"
| 15 || 22 || Montreal Canadiens || 6–2 || 9–2–4
|- align="center" bgcolor="#CCFFCC"
| 16 || 25 || New York Americans || 6–0 || 10–2–4
|- align="center" bgcolor="#CCFFCC"
| 17 || 27 || Chicago Black Hawks || 3–1 || 11–2–4
|-

|- align="center" bgcolor="#CCFFCC"
| 18 || 1 || Detroit Falcons || 3–0 || 12–2–4
|- align="center" bgcolor="white"
| 19 || 3 || @ Chicago Black Hawks || 1 – 1 OT || 12–2–5
|- align="center" bgcolor="#CCFFCC"
| 20 || 5 || Montreal Maroons || 2–0 || 13–2–5
|- align="center" bgcolor="#FFBBBB"
| 21 || 7 || @ Montreal Maroons || 4–3 || 13–3–5
|- align="center" bgcolor="#CCFFCC"
| 22 || 10 || Toronto Maple Leafs || 2–0 || 14–3–5
|- align="center" bgcolor="#CCFFCC"
| 23 || 12 || @ Boston Bruins || 5 – 3 OT || 15–3–5
|- align="center" bgcolor="#CCFFCC"
| 24 || 14 || Boston Bruins || 3–1 || 16–3–5
|- align="center" bgcolor="#FFBBBB"
| 25 || 17 || @ Detroit Falcons || 4–2 || 16–4–5
|- align="center" bgcolor="#FFBBBB"
| 26 || 19 || Montreal Canadiens || 5–3 || 16–5–5
|- align="center" bgcolor="#CCFFCC"
| 27 || 24 || Detroit Falcons || 4 – 3 OT || 17–5–5
|- align="center" bgcolor="#FFBBBB"
| 28 || 28 || Boston Bruins || 4–1 || 17–6–5
|- align="center" bgcolor="#FFBBBB"
| 29 || 30 || @ Toronto Maple Leafs || 6 – 3 OT || 17–7–5
|- align="center" bgcolor="#CCFFCC"
| 30 || 31 || @ Chicago Black Hawks || 3–0 || 18–7–5
|-

|- align="center" bgcolor="#FFBBBB"
| 31 || 2 || Montreal Canadiens || 4–1 || 18–8–5
|- align="center" bgcolor="#CCFFCC"
| 32 || 7 || Chicago Black Hawks || 1–0 || 19–8–5
|- align="center" bgcolor="#FFBBBB"
| 33 || 9 || @ Boston Bruins || 2–1 || 19–9–5
|- align="center" bgcolor="#FFBBBB"
| 34 || 13 || @ Montreal Canadiens || 3–1 || 19–10–5
|- align="center" bgcolor="white"
| 35 || 16 || Detroit Falcons || 2 – 2 OT || 19–10–6
|- align="center" bgcolor="#FFBBBB"
| 36 || 18 || @ Toronto Maple Leafs || 5–3 || 19–11–6
|- align="center" bgcolor="#FFBBBB"
| 37 || 21 || New York Americans || 3–2 || 19–12–6
|- align="center" bgcolor="#CCFFCC"
| 38 || 23 || @ Boston Bruins || 2 – 0 OT || 20–12–6
|- align="center" bgcolor="white"
| 39 || 25 || Boston Bruins || 3 – 3 OT || 20–12–7
|-

|- align="center" bgcolor="#CCFFCC"
| 40 || 3 || @ Detroit Falcons || 2–1 || 21–12–7
|- align="center" bgcolor="#FFBBBB"
| 41 || 6 || @ Chicago Black Hawks || 4 – 3 OT || 21–13–7
|- align="center" bgcolor="#CCFFCC"
| 42 || 8 || Chicago Black Hawks || 6–1 || 22–13–7
|- align="center" bgcolor="#FFBBBB"
| 43 || 10 || @ New York Americans || 5–1 || 22–14–7
|- align="center" bgcolor="white"
| 44 || 13 || Montreal Maroons || 4 – 4 OT || 22–14–8
|- align="center" bgcolor="#FFBBBB"
| 45 || 15 || @ Montreal Maroons || 4–3 || 22–15–8
|- align="center" bgcolor="#FFBBBB"
| 46 || 18 || Toronto Maple Leafs || 6–3 || 22–16–8
|- align="center" bgcolor="#CCFFCC"
| 47 || 20 || @ New York Americans || 4–2 || 23–16–8
|- align="center" bgcolor="#FFBBBB"
| 48 || 22 || @ Detroit Falcons || 5–4 || 23–17–8
|-

Playoffs

Finals
The Toronto Maple Leafs swept the best-of-five series against the New York Rangers three games to none. The first two games were to be played in New York City but because the circus was in town, the second game was played in Boston. The third and final game was played in Toronto. It was called the "Tennis Series", because the Leafs scored 6 goals in each game. The Rangers scored 4 times in their own building, twice at Boston Garden, and four more in Toronto.

Key:  Win  Loss

Player statistics
Skaters

Goaltenders

†Denotes player spent time with another team before joining Rangers. Stats reflect time with Rangers only.
‡Traded mid-season. Stats reflect time with Rangers only.

See also 
 1931–32 NHL season

References 
 New York Rangers 1931–1932 Season

New York Rangers seasons
New York Rangers
New York Rangers
New York Rangers
New York Rangers
Madison Square Garden
1930s in Manhattan